The Karminsky Experience Inc. is a DJ and recording artist duo consisting of James Munns and Martin Dingle. Munns and Dingle began spinning together in small London nightlife locales during the early 1990s, and had a long running, successful circuit of performances, in various night clubs throughout England. Their full-length debut, The Power of Suggestion, was released by the Eighteenth Street Lounge Music label in 2003.  They are best known for their LP releases of The Power of Suggestion and Snapshot, both of which were put out under the ESL Music label, which was founded by Rob Garza and Eric Hilton of Thievery Corporation. Their newest album, Beat!, was released under a new label, Patterns of Behavior.

Discography

Albums
 The Power of Suggestion (2003)
 Snapshot (2007)
 Beat! (2016)

References

External links
 

Musical groups from London